The Writer Magazine/Emily Dickinson Award is given once a year to a member of the Poetry Society of America "to honor the memory and poetry of Emily Dickinson, for a poem inspired by Dickinson though not necessarily in her style." The winner receives a $250 prize.

Winners
2010: Marlene Rosen Fine, Judge: Marie Ponsot
2009: Richard Robbins, Judge: Graham Foust
2008: Joanie Mackowski, Judge: Donald Revell
2007: James Richardson, Judge: Matthea Harvey
2006: Nicole Cooley, Judge: Gerald Stern
2005: Lee Upton, Judge: Mark Doty
2004: Jason Schneiderman, Judge: Jane Mead
2001: Jan Heller Levi, Judge: Lynn Emanuel
2000: Jean Merrill Balderston
1996: Eve Sutton
1995: Lola Haskins

Notes

See also
 Poetry Society of America
 List of American literary awards
 List of poetry awards
 List of years in poetry

External links
 Poetry Society of America main awards Web page

American poetry awards
Emily Dickinson